Poolaki commonly called Pooleki is a type of candy made mainly in Isfahan, Iran. Its shape is in the form of a thin disc, pretty much like a very thin coin, which starts dissolving as it enters the mouth. It is made of sugar, water, white vinegar and some natural taste of saffron, dried lime or cocoa powder. It is similar to toffee. The word is similar to one called Poolak which means "small coin" in Persian. Poolaki is also a Persian surname.

References

Confectionery
Iranian desserts